= ISO 3166-1:CS =

The ISO 3166-1 alpha-2 code "CS" may refer to:

- Czechoslovakia (until 1993)
- Serbia and Montenegro (from 2003 to 2006)
